Sainte-Louise is a parish municipality in Quebec.

Demographics 

Notable people 
The artist Michèle Lorrain resides in Sainte-Louise.

See also
 List of municipalities in Quebec

References

Parish municipalities in Quebec
Incorporated places in Chaudière-Appalaches